Ali Issa Ibrahim Duba (born 1933), also known as Ali Douba, is a former head of the Syrian military intelligence and was a close adviser to the Syrian president Hafez al-Assad. The military intelligence under Douba was the single most important security agency in Syria, handling security within the army, but also dealing with the general safeguarding of the regime.

Early life
Douba was born to a small landowning family from the Alawite tribe of Matawira, in the village of Qurfays in the Jableh District south of Latakia. He joined the Ba'ath Party in the early 1950s while studying at the Holy Land Secondary School in Latakia.

Career
Douba joined the Syrian Army in 1955 and became the deputy head of internal security at the Damascus branch of the General Intelligence Directorate five years later. He served as military attaché at the Syrian embassy in Great Britain between 1964 and 1966, and in Bulgaria between 1967 and 1968. He returned to Syria and became the head of military intelligence for the Latakia region. In November 1970, he was appointed the head of military intelligence for the city of Damascus, where he supported Hafez al-Assad's coup d'état. In 1971, he was made deputy head of military intelligence,  under Hikmat al-Shihabi. Three years later he was made head of this department. He was elected to the Central Committee of the Syrian Regional Branch of the Arab Socialist Ba'ath Party in 1978, and promoted to general in 1981. Douba took part in suppressing the Muslim Brotherhood revolt in Hama during February 1982. In December 1983, when President Hafez al-Assad was ill, Duba was a member of the committee responsible for governing the state in the interim. In 1985, the Syrian president put him in charge of the Lebanon dossier, along with al-Shihabi and Ghazi Kanaan. Douba was promoted to lieutenant general and appointed deputy chief of the General Staff in January 1993, in addition to his role as head of the military intelligence. In 1999 he was pushed aside by Bashar al-Assad over fears that he could be a rival for the presidency, and was made to retire in February 2000. He is still living in Syria.
EU Council Regulation 36/2012 places him on a list of persons whose funds are frozen.

References

1933 births
Syrian military personnel
Syrian Alawites
Living people
Arab Socialist Ba'ath Party – Syria Region politicians
People from Latakia Governorate
People of the Islamic uprising in Syria
Syrian individuals subject to the European Union sanctions